The Luandi (alternatively written as Xulianti ) was the ruling clan of the ancient Xiongnu that flourished between 3rd century BCE to 4th century CE. The form Luandi comes from the Book of Han, while the form Xulianti comes from the Book of Later Han.  

Lanhai Wei and Hui Li reconstruct the Old Chinese pronunciation of 挛鞮 as *lyuan-tlïγ, evolving from an earlier 虚连题 (*Hala-yundluγ), as a result of a historical sound shift involving the initial dropping of *h- by demonstrating its occurrence in several historical sources. Furthermore, the conjugation of the roots *hala, meaning colorful; *yund meaning horse, *-luγ as the participle suffix would have resulted in the semantic meaning "tribe with skewbald horses" in an early Turkic dialect, allowing it to be further identified with the historical Ulayundluğ tribe. Moreover, the authors argue that the conquest of the same clan by the Xue in the 4th century CE eventually gave birth to the Xueyantuo.  

Anna Dybo on the other hand reconstructs the Old Chinese pronunciation of 攣鞮 as *r(h)wan-de and posits that the clan's name, among other lexemes, were borrowed from "one of the Eastern Middle Iranian languages which was similar to a kind of archaic Khotanese Saka", and thus comparable to Khotanese Saka runde, plural of rre from *rwant- "king". There were four other noble tribes: Huyan, Xubu, Qiulin and Lan. The Huyan belonged to the dominating left wing, and the Lan and the Xubu belonged to the right wing. A source also considered Lan and Luandi as two variants of the same word due to their phonetic similarity. This was also attributed to the way the name Lan was used to identify Xiongnu's supreme rulers. 

The Luandi was a clan that held some of the highest positions in the Xiongnu society, including the title of chanyu within the Xiongnu confederacy. In the confederation, Luandi was a paternal dynastic tribe, Huyan was an initially maternal dynastic tribe, and Xubu was a subsequently maternal dynastic tribe. They were the three most prominent tribes ("Houses" in N. Bichurin) in the Xiongnu.

The earliest prominent figure from the clan itself was perhaps their leader Touman. He would be succeeded by his son Modu Chanyu. Later on, the branch of the Luandi clan that founded the Han Zhao dynasty changed their surname to Liu (劉), the surname of the Han dynasty emperors, while the branch that established the Hu Xia dynasty changed their surname to Helian (赫連).

See also
Tuqi
Jin Midi

Notes

References

Wang, Zhonghan (2004). "Outlines of Ethnic Groups in China". Taiyuan: Shanxi Education Press. . p. 134.
Lin, Gan (1986). "A Comprehensive History of Xiongnu". Beijing: People's Press. CN / K289. p. 11-12.
 Book of Han, vol. 94a.
 Book of Later Han, vol. 89.
 Bichurin N.Ya., "Collection of information on peoples in Central Asia in ancient times", vol. 1, Sankt Petersburg, 1851

Han dynasty
Nomadic groups in Eurasia
Asian royal families
Xiongnu